In geometry, smooth projective planes are special projective planes. The most prominent example of a smooth projective plane is the real projective plane . Its geometric operations of joining two distinct points by a line and of intersecting two lines in a point are not only continuous but even smooth (infinitely differentiable ). Similarly, the classical planes over the complex numbers, the quaternions, and the octonions are smooth planes. However, these are not the only such planes.

Definition and basic properties
A smooth projective plane  consists of a point space  and a line space  that are smooth manifolds and where both geometric operations of joining and intersecting are smooth.

The geometric operations of smooth planes are continuous; hence, each smooth plane is a compact topological plane. Smooth planes exist only with point spaces of dimension 2m where , because this is true for compact connected projective topological planes. These four cases will be treated separately below.

Theorem. The point manifold of a smooth projective plane is homeomorphic to its classical counterpart, and so is the line manifold.

Automorphisms
Automorphisms play a crucial role in the study of smooth planes. A bijection of the point set of a projective plane is called a collineation, if it maps lines onto lines. The continuous collineations of a compact projective plane  form the group . This group is taken with the topology of uniform convergence. We have:

Theorem.

The automorphism groups of the four classical planes are simple Lie groups of dimension 8, 16, 35, or 78, respectively. All other smooth planes have much smaller groups. See below.

Translation planes
A projective plane is called a 

Theorem. Every smooth projective translation plane  is isomorphic to one of the four classical planes.

This shows that there are many compact connected topological projective planes that are not smooth. On the other hand, the following construction yields real analytic non-Desarguesian planes of dimension 2, 4, and 8, with a compact group of automorphisms of dimension 1, 4, and 13, respectively: represent points and lines in the usual way by homogeneous coordinates over the real or complex numbers or the quaternions, say, by vectors of length . These planes are self-dual.

2-dimensional planes
Then  is homeomorphic to the point space of the real plane , any two distinct lines intersect in a unique point, and the geometric operations are continuous (apply  to the complement of a line). A familiar family of examples was given by 
Moulton in 1902.  These planes are characterized by the fact that they have a 4-dimensional automorphism group. They are not isomorphic to a smooth plane. More generally, all non-classical compact 2-dimensional planes  such that  are known explicitly; none of these is smooth:

Theorem. If  is a smooth 2-dimensional plane and if , then  is the classical real plane .

4-dimensional planes
All compact planes  with a 4-dimensional point space and  have been classified. Up to duality, they are either translation planes or they are isomorphic to a unique so-called shift plane. Hence, the result on translation planes implies:

Theorem.

8-dimensional planes
Put . If , then  is a translation plane, or a dual translation plane, or a Hughes plane. The latter can be characterized as follows:  leaves some classical complex subplane  invariant and induces on  the connected component of its full automorphism group. The Hughes planes are not smooth. This yields a result similar to the case of 4-dimensional planes:

Theorem.

16-dimensional planes
Let  denote the automorphism group of a compact 16-dimensional topological projective plane . If , then  fixes a line  and a point , and the affine plane  and its dual are translation planes. If , then  also fixes an incident point-line pair, but neither  nor  are known explicitly. Nevertheless, none of these planes can be smooth:

Theorem.

Main theorem
The last four results combine to give the following theorem:

Complex analytic planes
The condition, that the geometric operations of a projective plane are complex analytic, is very restrictive. In fact, it is satisfied only in the classical complex plane.

Theorem. Every complex analytic projective plane is isomorphic as an analytic plane to the complex plane with its standard analytic structure.

Notes

References
 
 
 

Projective geometry
Surfaces